The Carnic Alps are a range of the Southern Limestone Alps in Austria and northeastern Italy. They are within Austrian East Tyrol and Carinthia,  and Italian Friuli (Province of Udine) and marginally in Veneto.

Etymology 
They are named after the Roman province of Carnia, which probably has a Celtic origin.

The mountains gave their name to the stage on the geologic time scale known as Carnian, an age in the Triassic Period.

Geography 

Alpine Club classification 

In the Carnic Alps is the southernmost glacier in Austria, the Eiskar, nestling in the Kellerwand massif.

Notable peaks 

Among the most important mountains of the range are:

  /  (2,782 m)
  (2,774 m)
  /  (2,694 m)
  /  (2,689 m)
  (2,603 m)
  (2,586 m)
  (2,474 m)
  (2,462 m)
  (2,434 m)
Cresta di Enghe (2,414 m)
Monte Ferro (2,348 m)
  (2,332 m)
  (2,280 m)
  (2,187 m)

Mountain passes 

The chief passes of the Carnic Alps are:
Plöcken Pass (Tolmezzo to Kötschach-Mauthen), road (1,360 m)
Naßfeld Pass (Pontebba to Hermagor-Pressegger See), road (1,552 m)
Öfnerjoch (Forni Avoltri to Sankt Lorenzen im Lesachtal), footpath (2,301 m)
Wolayer Pass (same to Kötschach-Mauthen), footpath (1,922 m)

See also 
 Carnic Prealps
 Limestone Alps

References

External links

 Carnic Alps on SummitPost
 Carnic Alps on Hike.uno
 Portal and interactive key to the flora of the S Carnic Alps

 
Mountain ranges of the Alps
Southern Limestone Alps
Mountain ranges of Italy
Mountain ranges of Carinthia (state)

Mountain ranges of Tyrol (state)
Mountain ranges of South Tyrol
Geography of East Tyrol
Province of Udine
Triassic Europe